is a passenger railway station located in Sakai-ku, Sakai, Osaka Prefecture, Japan, operated by the private railway operator Nankai Electric Railway. It has the station number "NK10".

Lines

Layout
The station consists of one elevated island platform with the station building underneath.

Platforms

Adjacent stations

History
Shichidō Station opened on 21 April 1917.

Passenger statistics
In fiscal 2019, the station was used by an average of 11,402 passengers daily.

Surrounding area
 AEON MALL Sakai Teppocho.
 Shutaku-ji Temple
 Somi-ji Temple
 Kawaguchi Ekai Birthplace site

See also
 List of railway stations in Japan

References

External links

  

Railway stations in Japan opened in 1917
Railway stations in Osaka Prefecture
Sakai, Osaka